Yesterday, Today & Tomorrow is the third album led by guitarist Billy Butler which was recorded in 1970 and released on the Prestige label.

Reception

Allmusic awarded the album 8 stars stating "Billy Butler was a guitarist's guitarist and an innovator in both production and arrangements. This disc is solid from top to bottom and reveals the restless spirit of a quiet yet decomposing artist".

Track listing 
All compositions by Billy Butler except where noted
 "Yesterday, Today and Tomorrow" - 5:14     
 "Girl Talk" (Neal Hefti, Bobby Troup) - 4:57     
 "Dancing on the Ceiling" (Lorenz Hart, Richard Rodgers) - 5:45     
 "Hold It!" (Billy Butler, Clifford Scott) - 3:52     
 "Evening Dreams" - 4:11     
 "The Butler Did It" - 3:49     
 "Sweet Georgia Brown" (Ben Bernie, Kenneth Casey, Maceo Pinkard) - 4:48  
Recorded at Van Gelder Studio in Englewood Cliffs, New Jersey on April 27 (tracks 5 & 6), and June 29 (tracks 1-4 & 7), 1970

Personnel 
Billy Butler - guitar, bass guitar
Houston Person - tenor saxophone (tracks 1-4 & 7)
Jerome Richardson - tenor saxophone, flute (tracks 5 & 6) 
Ernie Hayes (tracks 1-4 & 7), Sonny Phillips (tracks 5 & 6) - organ, electric piano 
Everett Barksdale, Billy Suyker - guitar (tracks 5 & 6)
Jimmy Lewis (tracks 1-4 & 7), Chuck Rainey (tracks 5 & 6) - electric bass 
Jimmy Johnson - drums

References 

Billy Butler (guitarist) albums
1970 albums
Prestige Records albums
Albums recorded at Van Gelder Studio
Albums produced by Bob Porter (record producer)